Carl Spilhaus (born 11 November 1963) is a South African cricketer. He played in 42 first-class and 12 List A matches from 1985/86 to 1995/96.

References

External links
 

1963 births
Living people
South African cricketers
Boland cricketers
Border cricketers
Western Province cricketers
Cricketers from Cape Town